United Nations Security Council Resolution 1672, adopted on April 25, 2006, after recalling resolutions 1556 (2004), 1591 (2005), 1651 (2005) and 1665 (2006) on the situation in Sudan, the Council imposed travel and financial sanctions on four Sudanese individuals over their involvement in the Darfur conflict. It was the first time sanctions had been adopted against individuals in the region.

The measures, imposed under Chapter VII of the United Nations Charter, were placed on Sheikh Musa Hillal, a leader of the Sudanese government backed Janjaweed militia in Darfur, and Major General Mohamed Elhassen, commander of Sudan's western military region. Sanctions were also placed on two rebel commanders: Gabriel Abdul Kareen Badri of the National Movement for Reform and Development, and Adam Yacub Shant, head of the Sudan Liberation Movement/Army.

At the same time, the Security Council stressed its commitment to peace in Darfur, the end of violence and the implementation of the Comprehensive Peace Agreement.

Resolution 1672 was adopted by 12 votes in favour to none against and three abstentions from China, Qatar and Russia.  All three had reservations about the application of sanctions to the individuals concerned.

See also
 African Union Mission in Sudan
 African Union – United Nations Hybrid Operation in Darfur
 International response to the War in Darfur
 List of United Nations Security Council Resolutions 1601 to 1700 (2005–2006)
 Southern Sudan
 Timeline of the War in Darfur
 War in Darfur

References

External links
 
Text of the Resolution at undocs.org

 1672
2006 in Sudan
 1672
April 2006 events